A list of notable diplomats from Slovenia:

B 
 Katja Boh

C 
 Izidor Cankar
 Philipp von Cobenzl

D 
 Mojca Drčar Murko

H 
 Sigismund von Herberstein
 Ivan Hribar

J 
 Iztok Jarc

K 
 Roman Kirn
 Ciril Kotnik
 Alojzij Kuhar

L 
 Ladislav Lipič

M 
 Dragutin Mate

N 
 Anton Novačan

P 
 Ernest Petrič
 Janko Pleterski

R 
 Dimitrij Rupel

Š 
 Matjaž Šinkovec

T 
 Danilo Türk
 Ludvik Toplak

V 
 Bogumil Vošnjak

Ž 
 Samuel Žbogar

 
Diplomat